Jowrni (also Romanized as Jowrnī; also known as Jornī) is a village in Baranduz Rural District, in the Central District of Urmia County, West Azerbaijan Province, Iran. At the 2006 census, its population was 366, in 62 families.

References 

Populated places in Urmia County